was a member and deputy leader of the Japanese doomsday-cult group Aum Shinrikyo. Hayakawa was born in Hyōgo Prefecture in 1949. After Aum Shinrikyo adopted a "ministry system", he was the Minister of Construction. Hayakawa was the person behind the organization's uranium mining at Banjawarn in Australia.

Convicted for his participation in the Sakamoto family murder and several other crimes, Hayakawa was executed on July 6, 2018, at Fukuoka Detention House.

Early life
Hayakawa was born in Hyōgo Prefecture in 1949. His father was a staff member of the National Japanese National Railways. In 1952, his family moved to Sakai, Osaka. Hayakawa earned his bachelor degree in Kobe University. Then he went to the Graduate School of Osaka Prefecture University. After graduation, he was hired by a giant general contractor.

Joining Aum Shinrikyo
After a phone conversation with Asahara, he was touched by his sincerity and decided to join Aum Shinrikyo.

In following years, Hayakawa was believed to be involved in a series of crimes committed by Aum Shinrikyo, including killing a former member of Aum Shinrikyo called Shuji Taguchi and the Sakamoto family murder. In 1990, after the campaign for election of Aum Shinrikyo turned into a fiasco, this cult group decided to overthrow the government of Japan by force. To help Aum Shinrikyo's plan, Hayakawa went to Russia. To get access to the technical documents of military equipment, he presented some high-performance computers to Moscow Institute of Physics and Technology. Finally, he not only knew the synthesis method of LSD, but also succeeded to get the design drawing of a type of automatic rifle. He even helped Aum Shinrikyo purchase a Mil Mi-17 helicopter.

As the deputy leader of Aum Shinrikyo, Hayakawa arrived in Western Australia in April 1994, and then purchased an area of nearly 2000 square kilometers known as the Banjawarn Station. The organization started mining uranium there - apparently even before the sale was finalized. In his personal notes, Hayakawa praised the high quality of the uranium ore in Australia, although it referred to the state of South Australia, not to Banjawarn (which is in another state).

According to media reports from 1995, sheep carcasses in Banjawarn showed signs of exposure to sarin, the substance used in the Tokyo subway attack.

Hayakawa was arrested in Japan on April 19, 1995, shortly after the Tokyo subway sarin attack (and exactly on the day of the Oklahoma City bombing, although no relation between Aum Shinrikyo and the bombing is known). He was sentenced to death in 2000. In 2009, his appeal was dismissed. Hayakawa was executed on July 6, 2018, at Fukuoka Detention House.

See also
 Aum Shinrikyo
 Banjawarn Station
 Capital punishment in Japan
 List of executions in Japan

References

1949 births
2018 deaths
20th-century Japanese criminals
21st-century executions by Japan
Aum Shinrikyo
People executed by Japan by hanging
Kobe University alumni
Japanese people convicted of murder
People from Hyōgo Prefecture
Executed Japanese people